Amanda Sunyoto-Yang (born July 8, 1992) is an American pair skater who competes internationally for Taiwan. In 2011, she competed at the Asian Winter Games, as a singles skater, placing 13th. Competing in pair skating with her brother, Darryll Sulindro-Yang, she is a five-time Taiwanese national champion (2006, 2007, 2008, 2009, and 2010).

Personal life 
Sunyoto-Yang was born on July 8, 1992, in Los Angeles, California. She is pursuing a career in dentistry. She speaks Mandarin Chinese and has a gymnastics background.

Skating career 
Sunyoto-Yang started skating at the age of four in Singapore, where she was living at the time. Before moving to the United States, her family lived in Singapore for six years and Taiwan for two years.

In 2004, Sunyoto-Yang teamed up with her brother, Darryll Sulindro-Yang. They are the first pair team to represent Chinese Taipei in an international competition, which was the 2007 World Junior Figure Skating Championships. They are coached by Peter Oppegard and train at the East West Ice Palace in Artesia, California.

During the 2009–2010 season, they competed at the Nebelhorn Trophy competition, where they finished as the first alternates for the 2010 Winter Olympic Games.

Competitive highlights 
(with Darryll Sulindro-Yang)

Programs 
(with Darryll Sulindro-Yang)

References

External links 
 

Taiwanese female pair skaters
Taiwanese female single skaters
American female pair skaters
American female single skaters
1992 births
Living people
Figure skaters from Los Angeles
Figure skaters at the 2011 Asian Winter Games
People from San Marino, California
American sportspeople of Taiwanese descent